I, Barnabé is a Canadian animated short film, directed by Jean-François Lévesque and released in 2020. The film centres on a Roman Catholic priest who undergoes a crisis of faith.

The film premiered on June 14, 2020 at the Annecy International Animation Film Festival.

The film received a Canadian Screen Award nomination for Best Animated Short at the 9th Canadian Screen Awards, and a Prix Iris nomination for Best Animated Short Film at the 23rd Quebec Cinema Awards.

References

External links
 

2020 films
2020 animated films
Canadian animated short films
National Film Board of Canada animated short films
Quebec films
2020 short films
2020s animated short films
2020s Canadian films